Ibrahim Drešević (born 24 January 1997) is a professional footballer who plays as a centre-back for Turkish club Fatih Karagümrük. Born in Sweden, he represents the Kosovo national team. He previously represented Sweden at youth international level.

Club career

Elfsborg
His debut with Elfsborg came on 25 August 2016 in a 0–7 biggest away win in the second round of 2016–17 Svenska Cupen against IK Gauthiod after coming on as a substitute at 61st minute in place of Joakim Nilsson. Drešević made his first Allsvenskan appearance on 10 September after being named in the starting line-up in a 1–1 home draw against Kalmar.

Heerenveen
On 31 January 2019, Drešević signed a three-and-half-year contract with Eredivisie club Heerenveen. His debut with Heerenveen came sixteen days later in a 2–2 home draw against PSV after coming on as a substitute at 79th minute in place of Jizz Hornkamp.

Fatih Karagümrük
On 24 June 2022, Drešević signed a two-year contract with Süper Lig club Fatih Karagümrük. His debut with Fatih Karagümrük came on 21 August in a 4–1 away defeat against Beşiktaş after being named in the starting line-up.

International career

Youth
From 2014, until 2017, Drešević has been part of Sweden at youth international level, respectively has been part of the U17 and U19 teams and he with these teams played thirteen matches and scored one goal.

Senior
On 22 May 2019, Drešević received a call-up from Kosovo for the UEFA Euro 2020 qualifying matches against Montenegro and Bulgaria, but he was not available for these matches after FIFA did not permit him to play for Kosovo due to problems with his documentation. On 23 August 2019, FIFA gave permission for Drešević to play for Kosovo. His debut with Kosovo came on 10 October 2019 in a friendly match against Gibraltar after being named in the starting line-up.

Personal life
Drešević was born in Fuxerna, Lilla Edet, Sweden, to Albanian parents from Tuzi, Montenegro.

Career statistics

Club

International

References

External links

1997 births
Living people
People from Lilla Edet Municipality
Sportspeople from Västra Götaland County
Kosovan men's footballers
Kosovo international footballers
Kosovan expatriate footballers
Kosovan expatriate sportspeople in Sweden
Kosovan expatriate sportspeople in the Netherlands
Kosovan expatriate sportspeople in Turkey
Kosovan people of Montenegrin descent
Swedish men's footballers
Sweden youth international footballers
Swedish expatriate footballers
Swedish expatriate sportspeople in the Netherlands
Swedish expatriate sportspeople in Turkey
Swedish people of Kosovan descent
Swedish people of Albanian descent
Swedish people of Montenegrin descent
Association football central defenders
Allsvenskan players
IF Elfsborg players
Eredivisie players
SC Heerenveen players
Süper Lig players
Fatih Karagümrük S.K. footballers